DeShaun Xavier Foster (born January 10, 1980) is a former American football running back, who currently serves as the running backs coach at UCLA. He was drafted by the Carolina Panthers in the second round of the 2002 NFL Draft. He played college football at UCLA. He is a member of the 2022 class of the UCLA Athletics Hall of Fame.

Early years
Foster was born to father Albert and mother Cheryl. He attended Tustin High School in Tustin, California, and lettered three times each in football and basketball, and four times in track. In football, as a senior, he was named the USA Today Player of the Year and finished his senior season with 3,998 rushing yards and a state single season record 59 touchdowns. For his career, he rushed for a total of 5,885 yards.  As a senior, he led his team to the CIF championship game where they lost to Santa Margarita, and QB Carson Palmer.

College career
Foster played football at UCLA, where he set a team rushing record for true freshmen with 673 yards and 10 touchdowns on 126 carries in 11 games.  The next year, he spent mostly on the bench with an ankle sprain, but still managed to record 375 yards and 6 scores on 111 carries. As a junior, he led the Bruins with 1,037 yards, while scoring 13 touchdowns. His final year, he posted 1,109 yards with 12 touchdowns; he had six games of over 100 rushing yards. He set a school record with a 301-yard game against Washington, and tied a record with four touchdowns (both records since broken by Maurice Jones-Drew). He ended his college career in the team top 10 in touchdowns, rushing yards, and points scored.

Professional career

Carolina Panthers
Foster was chosen in the second round (34th overall) of the 2002 NFL Draft. He had a promising preseason, but was injured in a game against the New England Patriots, and sat out the remainder of the season on injured reserve. However, he returned the following season as a complement to Stephen Davis; whose bruising style matched well with Foster's speed. Foster finished the regular season with 113 carries for 429 yards. However, his best performances came in the 2003-04 playoffs. He had a memorable run in the NFC Championship Game against the Philadelphia Eagles, where he broke four tackles on a one-yard run to score, giving the Panthers a 14-3 lead. In Super Bowl XXXVIII against the Patriots, Foster scored on a 33-yard run that stands as the fifth-longest touchdown run in Super Bowl history. The following season looked promising for the Panthers, but many of the starters suffered season-ending injuries, and Foster was no exception. He broke his clavicle in a game against the Denver Broncos. He returned the following season (2005) and surpassed Davis as the Panthers' starter. He led the team in yardage and carries, helping the Panthers to an 11-5 record. In a 23-0 wild card victory over the New York Giants, Foster set franchise records for carries (27), yards (151) and average (5.59) in a playoff game, but suffered a broken ankle in a playoff game against the Chicago Bears that left him out for the remainder of the playoffs (though it preserved his franchise record 102.5 yards per game in a playoff season).

On, March 10, 2006, Foster agreed to a three-year, $14.5 million contract with a $4.5 million signing bonus with another $3 million in escalators and incentives. This was a $700,000 raise over the transition tag tender placed on Foster in February. He led the team in rushing attempts and yards the next two seasons, increasingly splitting time with DeAngelo Williams.

On February 21, 2008, he was released by the Panthers.

San Francisco 49ers

On February 29, 2008, the San Francisco 49ers signed Foster to a one-year contract worth around $1.8 million, to be a back-up behind starter Frank Gore. 
He played in 16 games, amassing 234 rushing yards and 133 receiving yards.

Career statistics

Coaching career
In 2012, he joined UCLA as a volunteer assistant, before becoming a graduate assistant the following year. In 2015, he became UCLA's Director of Player Development & High School Relations. In 2016, he left UCLA to serve as the running backs coach for Texas Tech under Kliff Kingsbury. On January 21, 2017, he was named running backs coach at UCLA.

References

External links

 Carolina Panthers bio

1980 births
Living people
American football running backs
UCLA Bruins football players
Carolina Panthers players
San Francisco 49ers players
Players of American football from Charlotte, North Carolina
Sportspeople from Orange County, California
People from Tustin, California
Players of American football from California
Texas Tech Red Raiders football coaches
UCLA Bruins football coaches
Ed Block Courage Award recipients